Blakea asplundii is a species of plant in the family Melastomataceae. It is found in Peru and Ecuador.

References

asplundii
Flora of Ecuador
Flora of Peru
Taxonomy articles created by Polbot
Vulnerable plants
Taxobox binomials not recognized by IUCN